Józef Ćwierczakiewicz, Józef Ćwierciakiewicz (1822 – 12 September 1869 in Geneva), also known as Joseph Card, was a Polish journalist, representative of Komitet Centralny Narodowy in West Prussia (Pomerania) in 1861-1863, and agent of Komitet Centralny Narodowy in England in 1862-1863. After the failure of the January Uprising, he moved to Geneva and became active in the League of Peace and Freedom. He also became an immigration activist in France, Great Britain and Switzerland.

Notes

1822 births
1869 deaths
People of the January Uprising
19th-century Polish journalists
Male journalists
19th-century Polish writers